Trumpet or The Trumpet is a village in Herefordshire, England. The village is named after the timber-framed Trumpet Inn.

The inn is located at a major crossroads of the A438 and A417/A4172 from where:

The half-timbered inn is said to be some 800 years old and so named from the obligation of coaches that passed by to blow their coach horns.

The crossing must have been an important intersection of the Gloucester to Leominster and Tewkesbury to Hereford roads.

Local agriculture includes the growing of hops and cider apples.

External links

BBC Hereford and Worcester

Villages in Herefordshire